Wonder Boy III can refer to:

 Wonder Boy III: The Dragon's Trap, originally released for the Master System in 1989.
 Wonder Boy III: Monster Lair, originally released as an arcade game in 1988.